The British Library Preservation Advisory Centre was established as the National Preservation Office by the British Library Board in 1984, and was renamed to the British Library Preservation Advisory Centre in 2009. 

During its existence it raised public awareness of preservation issues in libraries and served as a nexus for developing and promoting improved preservation management of library and archive materials in the UK and Ireland. 

The centre closed on 31 March 2014, and all publications and resources were transferred to the British Library Collection Care webpages.

Purpose and activities
The Centre aimed to create a strategic policy for preserving current library collections, and addressed issues arising as digital collections evolved.  

Its work was focused on practical results:
 To assist cultural heritage agencies and organizations develop strategies for the preservation of cultural heritage assets in museums, libraries and archives, including the further development of the "Preservation Assessment Survey" (PAS) and training in the use of the PAS tools 
 To provide print and web-based information services for individuals and organizations, especially for collections throughout the United Kingdom and Ireland.
 To provide training in preservation management for individuals and organizations including relevant training in the following areas: introduction to preservation management; disaster management; environmental control and monitoring.

The need for national entities like the Centre had been documented in surveys conducted by the International Federation of Library Associations and Institutions (IFLA) Section on Preservation & Conservation and by the Ligue Internationale des Bibliothèques Européennes de Recherches.  Other than the United Kingdom, at least seven other countries have set up a similar entity, including Canada and New Zealand.

The Centre published an annual digest and report.

See also
 Digital Preservation Coalition
 Consortium of Research Libraries in the British Isles
 Ronald Milne
 National Digital Information Infrastructure and Preservation Program of the Library of Congress (NDIIPP)

References

 Beagrie, N. and D. Greenstein. (1998) "A Strategic Policy Framework for Creating and Preserving Digital Collections." British Library Research and Innovation Report 107. London: British Library.
 Bennett, J.C. (1997) "A Framework of Data Types and Formats, and Issues Affecting the Long Term Preservation of Digital Material." British Library Research and Innovation Report 50. London: British Library.
 Clements. (1986). "The National Preservation Office in the British Library," IFLA Journal (International Federation of Library Associations and Institutions). 12:25-32.
 Feeney, Mary, ed. (1999). Digital Culture: Maximizing the Nation's Investment. London: National Preservation Office, The British Library.
 Haynes, D., D. Streatfield, T. Jowett., and M. Blake. (1997). "Responsibility for Digital Archiving and Long-term Access to Digital Data." British Library Research and Innovation Report 67. The British Library, London: United Kingdom.
 Hendley. T. (1998). "Comparison of Methods and Costs of Digital Preservation." British Library Research and Innovation Report 106. London: United Kingdom.
 Matthews, G., A. Poulter, and E. Blagg. "Preservation of Digital Materials Policy and Strategy Issues for the UK." British Library Research and Innovation Report 41. London: United Kingdom. 1997.
 Ross, S. and A. Gow. (1999). "Digital Archaeology: The Recovery of Digital Materials at Risk." British Library Research and Innovation Report 108. London: United Kingdom. 1999.
 Stephens, David O. "Digital preservation in the United Kingdom," Information Management Journal,  October 2000.

External links
 Preservation Advisory Centre
 leaflets

Archival science
Library associations in the United Kingdom
British Library
1984 establishments in the United Kingdom